In Greek mythology, Megareus or  Menoeceus (Μενοικεύς)  was a warrior of Thebes, who figures in the war of the Seven against Thebes – the struggle between Eteocles and Polynices, the twin sons of Oedipus, for the throne of Thebes. He was known for his large stature, and is considered an anthropomorphic representation of his father's pride by some literary scholars.

Family 
Megareus was the son of Eurydice of Thebes and Creon, uncle of the two princes, and thus brother of Lycomedes, Haemon, Megara, Pyrrha and probably Henioche.

Mythology 
Creon supported Eteocles, the incumbent king. Megareus wanted to fight for Eteocles, but Creon did not want him to, fearing for his safety. Also, Tiresias, the blind prophet, told Creon that Eteocles would win if Creon sacrificed Megareus, reinforcing his decision. Creon suppressed Tiresias' prophecy, and sent Megareus to be sheltered away from the city of Thebes.

Despite this, Megareus joined the battle because he didn't want to be thought a coward. Overconfident and inexperienced, he was killed in the first clash. He is mentioned in Aeschylus's play Seven Against Thebes, where he is matched against Eteoclus at the gate of Neïs.

He is also mentioned  in Sophocles' play Antigone. His mother, Eurydice of Thebes, kills herself after learning that her son Haemon and his betrothed, Antigone, had both committed suicide. She thrusts a sword into her heart and curses Creon for the death of her two sons: Haemon and Megareus. He is also called Menoeceus in some versions of Antigone.

Notes

References 

 Aeschylus, translated in two volumes. 1. Seven Against Thebes by Herbert Weir Smyth, Ph. D. Cambridge, MA. Harvard University Press. 1926. Online version at the Perseus Digital Library. Greek text available from the same website.
 Sophocles, The Antigone of Sophocles edited with introduction and notes by Sir Richard Jebb. Cambridge. Cambridge University Press. 1893. Online version at the Perseus Digital Library.
 Sophocles, Sophocles. Vol 1: Oedipus the king. Oedipus at Colonus. Antigone. With an English translation by F. Storr. The Loeb classical library, 20. Francis Storr. London; New York. William Heinemann Ltd.; The Macmillan Company. 1912. Greek text available at the Perseus Digital Library.

Theban characters in Greek mythology
Characters in Seven against Thebes